Gilze-Rijen is a railway station located in Rijen, Netherlands in the municipality Gilze en Rijen. Although the railway station is located in Rijen, it's called Gilze-Rijen because of the Gilze-Rijen Air Base, just south of Rijen. The station was opened on 5 October 1863 and is located on the Breda–Eindhoven railway between Breda and Tilburg. The station is operated by Nederlandse Spoorwegen.

Train service
The following services currently call at Gilze-Rijen:
2x per hour local services (sprinter) 's-Hertogenbosch - Tilburg - Breda

Bus services

Bus Services 130, 131, 230 and 231 stop outside the station.

130 goes from the town hall in Rijen to the immigration detention centre in Gilze; 131 goes from Breda to Tilburg via Gilze and Rijen.

External links
NS website 
Dutch Public Transport journey planner 

Railway stations in North Brabant
Railway stations opened in 1863
Railway stations on the Staatslijn E
Gilze en Rijen